Chelsea Fox (also Atkins) is a fictional character from the BBC soap opera EastEnders, played by Tiana Benjamin from 2006 to 2010, and then Zaraah Abrahams from 2020 onwards. Benjamin was cast in the role and she left her role in the Harry Potter film series to appear in the soap, she made her first appearance as Chelsea in episode 3147, broadcast on 5 May 2006 as she is introduced as part of the all-female Fox family alongside her mother, Denise Fox (Diane Parish), and half-sister, Libby Fox (Belinda Owusu). Benjamin announced her departure from the show in April 2010, and she left in episode 4047, broadcast on 5 August 2010. In October 2020, the character's return was announced alongside Abrahams' casting, Chelsea returns in episode 6188/6189, broadcast on 25 December 2020.

Storylines

2006–2010
Upon Chelsea's arrival, she is seduced by Grant Mitchell (Ross Kemp), unaware he is dating her to make Jane Collins (Laurie Brett) jealous. However, when Denise uncovers the truth, Grant ends the relationship. Chelsea becomes friends with Deano Wicks (Matt Di Angelo) and initially works for Billy Mitchell (Perry Fenwick) at his video shop, but is sacked. She then finds employment at Tanya Branning's (Jo Joyner) salon, Booty, and falls for Sean Slater (Robert Kazinsky). Although, Sean is promiscuous and pursues other women, including Tanya and Carly Wicks (Kellie Shirley), while Chelsea wants a serious relationship. Attempting to keep Sean away from Carly, Chelsea sets her up on a date with Warren Stamp (Will Mellor), who tries to assault Carly. Sean rescues her and animosity between the girls escalates, particularly when Sean dumps Chelsea for Carly. Carly's brother, Deano, is attracted to Chelsea and, using this to her advantage, she and Deano sabotage Carly and Sean's relationship. When Patrick Trueman (Rudolph Walker) is attacked, Chelsea and Deano frame Sean, stealing CCTV evidence that clears Sean but Carly finds it and gives it to the police. Sean is released and the police charge Chelsea and Deano with perverting the course of justice. Sean gets revenge by cutting Chelsea's hair while she sleeps and having Deano beaten by a gang of thugs. She and Deano are sentenced to six months imprisonment and released after three.

Chelsea befriends Shabnam Masood (Zahra Ahmadi) in hopes to get closer to Jalil Iqbal (Jan Uddin), but is devastated when he chooses Shabnam. Helped by her sister, Libby, Chelsea traces her father, Lucas Johnson (Don Gilet), who left her and Denise 20 years ago. She confronts him, revealing that she is his daughter but leaves before he responds. Two months later, Lucas appears. Chelsea is reluctant to see him but eventually agrees to go out for a birthday meal. However, she leaves on discovering that she has a half-brother, Jordan (Michael-Joel David Stuart). 

She buys drugs from Sean and steals money from work to buy more but gets beaten up by a group of girls. Tanya fires her and Patrick catches her taking cocaine. He locks her in her room and calls Lucas to help. When he arrives, Chelsea has escaped through the bedroom window. Lucas finds her in R&R nightclub, high on cocaine, and takes her home. Chelsea gets her job back at Booty. She falls in love with Theo Kelly (Rolan Bell), but upon dating, Chelsea feels excluded from Theo and his university friends. She later cheats on him with a footballer named Ellis Prince (Michael Obiora), who offers her drugs. A guilt-ridden Chelsea confesses her infidelity to Theo and despite his forgiving her, insists she cannot be with him and ends the relationship. She resumes her relationship with Ellis but Lucas finds the drugs Ellis gave her and confronts Chelsea. She runs away with Ellis, leaving a note for her family but returns on Libby's birthday, demanding to know why Libby's grandmother, Liz Turner (Kate Williams) is in Albert Square, forcing her to admit she has been visiting her father, Owen Turner (Lee Ross), in prison and is glad that he is going to be released. Chelsea is cautious of her family's safety when Owen returns to the Square, and pleads with him not to bring up the suspicious death of Lucas's ex-wife, Trina Johnson (Sharon Duncan Brewster), again as Denise was a suspect and could get in trouble.

Chelsea and Roxy Mitchell (Rita Simons) both pursue Dr. Al Jenkins (Adam Croasdell), becoming rivals as the doctor is dating them both secretly. Chelsea assists Jordan in his protest to get a tree planted in Trina's memory and manages to win Al. However, just before Chelsea and Al get together, Roxy turns up at his office dressed as a nurse, so Chelsea leaves, embarrassed. Despite this, when Roxy inherits The Queen Victoria public house, she employs Chelsea as a barmaid. Denise sets Chelsea up on a blind date with an associate of Lucas's called Matthew, but Chelsea does not enjoy the date and tells Jack Branning (Scott Maslen) she wants to leave. While she is in the toilet, Jack tells Matthew that Chelsea has a boyfriend so he leaves. Chelsea and Jack start dating and she returns to work at the salon, now named Roxy's. When Jack is shot and hospitalised, Chelsea declares her love for him and stays with him in hospital but Jack ends it as he is still in love with Ronnie. Later, Chelsea and her colleague Amira Masood (Preeya Kalidas) worry that they are pregnant and take pregnancy tests. Amira's is negative but Chelsea's is positive. She decides to keep the baby but decides not to tell Jack as it would not change anything but she does not want to be a single mother. After Denise sees Chelsea crying and spending time with Zainab Masood's (Nina Wadia) baby, Kamil (Arian Chikhlia), she tells Libby that she thinks Chelsea is pregnant. Chelsea admits it when Denise asks her and they have a heart-to-heart, which Lucas joins in. She takes the test again and realises she is not pregnant but tells her parents that she'll make her own decisions. She tells Amira that it was her test that was positive and promises to keep her secret when she leaves Walford after learning that her husband Syed (Marc Elliott) is gay.

Chelsea goes on to celebrate her birthday and discovers Denise has put a picture of Chelsea in the newspaper wearing a cowboy suit. Much to Chelsea's embarrassment, so she decides to buy all the newspapers so people will not mock her. When Roxy discovers it is Chelsea's birthday she decides to throw her a western themed birthday. Chelsea starts to fall for the DJ but Roxy is caught kissing him.

When Owen's body is discovered buried under the Square, Denise is taken for questioning. Chelsea thinks that Denise may have killed Trina and Owen as Lucas had told her that Denise was hiding Trina's bracelet in her bag. Chelsea tells Libby about the bracelet, and after Denise is released without charge, they see her leaving the Square alone and receive a text message from her saying "I'm sorry", unaware that Lucas killed Owen and confessed to Denise, took her to a canal and strangled her, sending the text message before he threw the phone in the canal. The police tell the family that Denise's car has been found by the canal and a body is pulled from the water along with Denise's mobile phone. Chelsea wonders who her mother really is and says it makes her some kind of monster. She offers to go with Lucas to identify the body but she is unable to go in so he goes in alone and identifies it as Denise, leaving Chelsea devastated. Chelsea believes that her mother killed Owen and then herself. After Denise's funeral, Chelsea and Libby agree to start packing up Denise's belongings. While celebrating Libby's birthday, Denise walks in, revealing that she is not dead but that Lucas has been keeping her prisoner, and that he killed Trina and Owen. Chelsea tells her to stay away from her, calling her a murderer. Lucas enters and confirms that Denise is telling the truth but Chelsea says he is covering up for her and she faked her own death. However, Lucas takes the family hostage, but when Jordan arrives, they escape and Lucas is arrested.

Chelsea says she no longer has a normal family, and argues with Libby over their parents. After speaking to Liz, Chelsea decides she wants to move to Spain with her, as people in Walford will only ever think of her as the daughter of a murderer. Denise initially argues with Chelsea about this, but eventually agrees, encouraging Libby to go too for a holiday before returning to university. After leaving drinks in The Queen Victoria pub, Chelsea, Libby and Liz leave Walford in the back of a taxi.

In November 2011, Amira states that Chelsea is living in Málaga, Spain. In May 2014, Denise goes to Spain with Libby to celebrate Chelsea's birthday. In August 2015, when Libby returns to Walford for her birthday, Chelsea calls her, urging her to tell Denise something, but Libby cannot go through with it. In December 2015, Libby reveals to Denise that Jordan briefly lived with her and Chelsea in Spain, however he caused an endless amount of trouble for them, so Chelsea kicked him out.

2020–present
In December 2020, Denise is surprised to see Chelsea (now played by Zaraah Abrahams) with her father Lucas, who has recently been released from prison. Chelsea later returns to Albert Square, where she reveals to Denise that she has been in communication with Lucas for months and is upset with Denise for not telling her about her son, Raymond Dawkins. After an argument with Denise, Chelsea leaves with Lucas. Patrick, in cooperation with Raymond's father Phil Mitchell (Steve McFadden), meets Chelsea at The Queen Victoria public house to find out about Lucas' whereabouts. Later that day, Lucas is attacked in front of Chelsea after they leave a restaurant. Phil is blamed for Lucas's attack, but it is Chelsea's ex-boyfriend Caleb Malone (Ben Freeman) who is responsible for the attack. Chelsea is indebted to Caleb after fleecing him, and she is planning on using Lucas to smuggle drugs for Caleb. Chelsea arranges a trip to Spain with Lucas, planning to use him to smuggle drugs, but ultimately fails. Denise confronts Lucas about upsetting Chelsea, and they both go missing. Chelsea finds blood in Lucas's flat and believes that Lucas has hurt Denise and kidnapped her, but she later discovers that Caleb has taken Denise. Denise discovers the truth and reluctantly agrees to help Chelsea frame Lucas. They try to convince Lucas to follow Chelsea to Ibiza, but he later discovers their intentions. He vows to kill Caleb, but Chelsea threatens to abandon Lucas if he proceeds to do so, having not forgiven him for faking Denise's death, and she warns him that Caleb will kill her if he doesn’t help her to smuggle drugs. When Denise's boyfriend and Chelsea's ex-lover Jack, discovers Chelsea's plan, she attempts to seduce him to stop him from reporting her to the police. Lucas is ashamed of Chelsea's behavior and refuses to do the job unless she follows him to church, where he tells Chelsea to go to the police and face imprisonment. After a heart-to-heart, Lucas agrees to do the job but changes his mind leaving Chelsea alone. He is later arrested after being caught, and Chelsea later tips the police off when Caleb asks her to meet him, and he is arrested.

Chelsea begins a relationship with Gray Atkins (Toby-Alexander Smith) in June 2021, which is met with strong opposition by his former mother and father-in-law, Karen Taylor (Lorraine Stanley) and Mitch Baker (Roger Griffiths). During their relationship, Chelsea lives extravagantly on Gray's money and shows no interest in bonding with his children, Mia (Mahalia Malcolm) and Mackenzie (Isaac Lemonius), frequently neglecting them when they are in her care. Their relationship comes to an end when Chelsea witnesses Gray's volatile behaviour towards her and others and refuses to be mistreated by him. Chelsea soon discovers that she is pregnant, and plans to have an abortion, but is stopped by Gray's fling, Whitney Dean (Shona McGarty). Whitney accompanies her to an abortion clinic, but after having a scan and finding out that she is further along than expected, Chelsea decides to keep the baby. She decides to keep her pregnancy a secret from Gray and wants to raise the child alone, but Whitney urges her to tell him. Gray later finds out about Chelsea's pregnancy and initially agrees to have no involvement, but has a change of heart and decides that he wants to raise the child together with her. Gray and Chelsea become engaged, and on the day of their wedding, Whitney tells Chelsea that Gray killed his wife Chantelle (Jessica Plummer) through domestic violence. Chelsea decides to stop the wedding but is manipulated by Gray, who reveals that Whitney had kissed him. They eventually marry on Christmas Day 2021, but Chelsea later discovers Gray's abuse on Chantelle, when Whitney sends her screenshots of Chantelle's messages about her abuse that she had posted on an online forum shortly before her death. Chelsea then vows to leave Gray. She steals money from Ruby Allen's (Louisa Lytton) nightclub and plans on fleeing to Ibiza but is stopped in her tracks by Gray when he realises that she has stolen jewellery. When Gray confronts Chelsea, her waters break, and she is rushed to hospital, where she goes into premature labour, with Gray helping her. She gives birth to a son, who she calls Jordan Atkins, after her deceased half-brother. Chelsea decides to stay with Gray but later reveals to Whitney that she is temporarily using him for stability, and is planning to expose him. Chelsea, Whitney, and Chantelle's former fling Kheerat Panesar (Jaz Deol), orchestrate a plan to incriminate Gray for his crimes, however, Chelsea struggles to cope with Jordan who has been put into an incubator, and the revelation that Gray is a murderer. She tries to avoid Gray and opts to leave him and not go through with the plan, but is convinced by Whitney and Kheerat to become closer to Gray in the hopes of gaining a confession. 

Chelsea realises that she has made a mistake by marrying Gray, and becomes horrified when he tries to control her and strain her relationships with her friends and family. She decides to secretly register Jordan's birth certificate without Gray's knowledge but struggles to do so as her passport is out of date. Kheerat helps her to obtain a passport, but she is later devastated to discover that Gray has already registered Jordan's birth. Chelsea cracks and realises that she has become stuck in a controlling marriage and becomes isolated. Chelsea later develops Stockholm syndrome and turns on Whitney and Kheerat when they attempt to help her, especially when Gray assaults her by slamming her hand in a kitchen drawer. She is devastated to discover Gray's unconscious body after Kheerat attacks him in self-defense. Whilst Gray is hospitalised, Chelsea regains her confidence and avoids seeing Gray by lying that Jordan is still unwell. Gray is later released from hospital and when it is discovered that he murdered Tina Carter (Luisa Bradshaw-White) and buried her corpse underneath The Argee Bharjee, he takes Jordan from the hospital and plans on fleeing Walford. Chelsea finds Gray and he tries to persuade her to leave with him, but she confronts him about Chantelle's death and he confesses to killing her, although he reveals that it was an accident. Chelsea pretends to forgive him, however, unbeknownst to Gray, she has phoned the police and secretly recorded his confession. When Chelsea accidentally drops the phone, Gray realises that he has inadvertently confessed to the police, and proceeds to strangle Chelsea. He then attempts to attack her with a knife, but Chelsea punches him and tries to escape. Gray stops her and then flees when the police arrive; he is later arrested when Whitney and Mitch stop him from committing suicide by jumping off a bridge. Chelsea struggles knowing that she remained married to Gray despite knowing that he was a murderer, and decides to put Jordan up for adoption to protect him from growing up and discovering what Gray did. Denise opposes this and convinces Chelsea to keep Jordan after a heart-to-heart. Whitney offers to move in with Chelsea to help her look after Jordan, but they are shocked to discover that Gray has fallen behind in paying the rent, and they are subsequently evicted.

Chelsea moves back into No. 20 and begins working for Sam Mitchell (Kim Medcalf) after she takes over Ruby's nightclub. Eventually she moves back into Gray’s house with Whitney, and soon allows Mitch’s nephews Finlay (Ashley Byam) and Felix Baker (Matthew Morrison) to also live there. Chelsea becomes close to Ravi Gulati (Aaron Thiara), unaware that he has feelings for Denise. He later turns Chelsea down when Denise warns him to stop using her.

Creation and development
On 12 January 2006, an official BBC press report announced the introduction of a new character to EastEnders, Chelsea Fox. Chelsea was due to be part of a new, all female family joining the show, with Chelsea's mother Denise and her sister Libby (played by Diane Parish and Belinda Owusu respectively) completing the clan. The role was cast to Tiana Benjamin, who was 21 at the time. Benjamin has revealed that she was the second Fox to be cast, and on her final audition, she had a workshop and met Diane Parish there. Owusu was cast at a later date. Of her casting, Benjamin said "I've been a big fan of EastEnders since I was little and I'm very excited to join the show. I've always really admired Diane [Parish] and I can't wait to work with her – it really hasn't sunk in yet! [...] It's one of those jobs that's unlike any other. There's a lot that changes when you take on something as big as EastEnders. I [am] really happy and genuinely excited to be a part of the show." She added that the three actors who play the Fox family have a bond,  commenting "We all respect and understand each other, and manage to have a good time while we're filming too. I felt that we clicked from our first few scenes together." Benjamin quit her role as Angelina Johnson in the Harry Potter film series, in order to take the part. Chelsea made her first screen appearance in May 2006 and was the first of the Fox family to be seen by viewers.

Departure
In April 2010, it was announced that Benjamin had chosen to leave the show to pursue other projects. Of her decision, she said "I have had an amazing time at EastEnders and this has been a very difficult decision for me to make but now seems like the right time to move on and leave Chelsea behind even through she's been such a fantastic character to play." Her final episode was broadcast on 5 August 2010.

Recast and return
It was announced in October 2020 that the character would be reintroduced with the role recast to actress Zaraah Abrahams. The announcement followed the news that Don Gilet would reprise his role as Chelsea's father, Lucas Johnson. Abrahams expressed her excitement at joining the cast, while Jon Sen, the show's executive producer, praised Abrahams' casting and commented, "When Chelsea was around, trouble was never far away and that is as true as ever when she returns to Walford later this year".

References

External links

EastEnders characters
Fictional beauticians
Fictional waiting staff
Fictional Black British people
Fictional bartenders
Television characters introduced in 2006
Fictional cocaine users
Fictional criminals in soap operas
Female characters in television
Fictional prisoners and detainees
Fictional victims of domestic abuse
Fictional drug dealers